The Player of the Month is an association football award that recognises the best Segunda División player for each month of the season.

Winners

Multiple winners
The below table lists those who have won on more than one occasion.

As of October 2022 award.

Awards won by position
As of December 2022 award.

Awards won by nationality
As of December 2022 award.

Awards won by club
As of December 2022 award.

Footnotes

References

Association football player of the month awards
Segunda División trophies and awards
Spanish football trophies and awards